Malik-rammu (Akkadian: 𒈠𒌨𒉘𒈬 ma-lik-ram-mu; Edomite: 𐤌𐤋𐤊‬𐤓‬𐤌 Melek-ram — possibly meaning "Great King" or "King of Multitudes") was king of Udumi (Edom) around the year 701 BCE, during the reign of the Assyrian king Sennacherib. He is mentioned on Sennacherib's Prism in a list of kings who paid tribute to Assyria.

References

Kings of Edom
8th-century BC people